Prettl Produktions Holding GmbH is a German group of companies from Pfullingen, which is active in the five following segments; the automotive industry, energy, electronics , components & systems and strategic build-up.

According to the principle of company founder Franz W. Prettl, the group does not want to be dependent on any market. The Prettl Group currently has more than 9500 employees and sales of around €955 million in more than 25 countries.

Prettl is privately owned and is managed by the brothers Rolf and Erhardt Prettl.

In 2007, Prettl became the first German company in North Korea to acquire land in the special economic zone of Kaesong. The location in the controversial Kaesong province was not built after the incident with the ROKS Cheonan corvette. Instead, the company is investing in building a production facility in Vietnam.

Prettl is a sponsor of the Ducati Pramac team since 2017.

Group structure
The Prettl Group is managed as a holding company and is divided into 5 segments: Automotive, Electronics, Energy, Components & System and Strategic build-up. The parent company is Prettl Produktions Holding GmbH. Independent companies within the group are: 
Prettl Produktions Holding GmbH 
 Prettl Beteiligungs Holding GmbH 
 Prettl Foundation 
 Prettl Electronics GmbH 
 Prettl Electronics Lübeck GmbH 
 Prettl metal components GmbH 
 Prettl Home Appliance Solutions GmbH  
 Endress Elektrogerätebau GmbH 
 Jupiter food processors GmbH 
 Cherry GmbH 
 Short Kash Inc. 
 lesswire GmbH  
 PAS Management Holding GmbH  
 Protech GmbH 
 Refu Elektronik GmbH

References

Conglomerate companies established in 1953
Companies based in Baden-Württemberg
1953 establishments in West Germany